Heo Eugene (born April 6, 1979), better known by his stage name, H-Eugene (Hangul: H-유진), is a South Korean rapper known for his collaborations with K-pop stars. The musicians he has collaborated with include MC Mong, Teddy Park, Miryo of Brown Eyed Girls, and Yenny of Wonder Girls. In 2010, he formed the duo H2 with singer Han Soo Yeon.

Discography

Studio albums

Extended plays

Single albums

Singles

Collaborations

References

South Korean male rappers
South Korean male singers
South Korean pop singers
South Korean hip hop record producers
South Korean comedians
South Korean television personalities
1979 births
Living people